Thanet & District Reform Synagogue, which is associated with the Movement for Reform Judaism, is a Reform Judaism congregation at 293A Margate Road in Ramsgate in Thanet, Kent, England.  Founded in 1985, it is also known as Etz Chaim, a name it shares with its journal.

Cliff Cohen is the community's rabbi.

See also
 List of Jewish communities in the United Kingdom
 List of former synagogues in the United Kingdom
 Movement for Reform Judaism

References

External links 
 Official website
 Movement for Reform Judaism: Thanet & District Reform Synagogue

Reform synagogues in the United Kingdom
Ramsgate